Decision theology is the belief of some evangelical denominations of Christianity, such as the Baptist Churches and Methodist Churches, that individuals must make a conscious decision to "accept" and follow Christ (be "born again", also known as experiencing the "New Birth"). 

In denominations of the Methodist tradition, after experiencing the New Birth (the first work of grace), ministers teach that believers should seek entire sanctification (the second work of grace). While Methodists teach that these works of grace can be experienced anywhere, revival services in tents and camp meetings are often held to call individuals to experience the New Birth and entire sanctification; altar calls in which individuals approach the mourner's bench or chancel rails to seek these works of grace also take place in services of worship throughout the year.

Lutherans and Reformed Christians reject the "decision theology", believing that faith receives the gift of salvation rather than causes salvation. These Christian denominations object to the "decision theology" as contradicting the monergism of orthodox historic Lutheranism and Reformed Christianity. Methodist theology, on the other hand, is synergistic and teaches that all individuals have free will to accept Jesus and be made holy.

See also

Sinner's prayer
Conditional preservation of the saints

References

External links

 

Christian soteriology
Methodism
Baptist Christianity
Arminianism